James Finlen (born 1829) was a British radical activist.

Based in London, Finlen worked a number of jobs.  He was active in the Chartist movement by 1851, when he represented Finsbury at its convention.  He was elected to the executive of the National Charter Association (NCA) in 1852, and was a delegate to the Manchester Labour Parliament in 1854.  He began working closely with Ernest Jones, the two launching the People's Paper, and with Jones' support he became joint leader of the NCA in 1856.

In 1857, Finlen fell out with Jones.  He moved to Glasgow, where he attempted to launch as new Northern Star newspaper, as a rival to the People's Paper.  He was also active in the National Political Union in this period.  He remained active in the Chartist movement, and in 1866 began working for the Reform League as a travelling lecturer.  He was a strong supporter of the Fenian Martyrs, a position which the league came to oppose, and as a result he left the movement in 1868, fading from attention.

In 1888, politician George Howell tracked Finlen down, living in Warrington under a pseudonym.

References

1829 births
Year of death unknown
Chartists
People from London